17 Themes for Ockodektet is a live album by The Jeff Kaiser Ockodektet, released in 2002 on pfMENTUM – CD010.

Track listing

Credits 
Acoustic Guitar [Prepared] – Ernesto Diaz-Infante
Conductor, Trumpet, Composed By, Arranged By, Recorded By, Mastered By, Design, Layout – Jeff Kaiser
Contrabass – Jim Connolly, Scott Walton
Drums – Billy Mintz, Richie West
Electric Guitar – Tom McNalley
Electric Guitar, Electronics – G.E. Stinson
Euphonium, Valve Trombone – Eric Sbar
Organ, Theremin, Electronics – Wayne Peet
Percussion – Brad Dutz
Trombone – Michael Vlatkovich
Trumpet – Dan Clucas, Kris Tiner
Tuba – Mark Weaver
Woodwind – Emily Hay, Eric Barber, Lynn Johnston, Vinny Golia

References 

2002 albums
Avant-garde jazz albums